Emille Kitnurse (born October 18, 1958) is a wrestler who represents the United States Virgin Islands. He competed in the men's freestyle 52 kg at the 1976 Summer Olympics.

References

External links
 

1958 births
Living people
United States Virgin Islands male sport wrestlers
Olympic wrestlers of the United States Virgin Islands
Wrestlers at the 1976 Summer Olympics
Place of birth missing (living people)